The President of the National Assembly of Nicaragua is the presiding officer of the legislature of Nicaragua, National Assembly.

See also
List of years in Nicaragua
National Congress of Nicaragua - Former bicameral legislature until 1979

Sources

Various editions of The Europa World Year Book

Nicaragua, National Assembly, President

President of the National Assembly